Las Águilas-Jungle Park is a zoological and botanical park located near the Los Cristianos beach on the Canary Island of Tenerife. The park also boasts daily flight shows featuring exotic birds and birds of prey.

Las Águilas-Jungle Park is operated by Spanish tourism group Aspro Ocio S.A. It is the largest such group operating in Europe and is better known for its chain of parks called Aqualand.

One of the park's main attractions are two white lions from South Africa these make up a big cat collection including leopards, jaguars, Bengal tiger, white tigers and pumas. The park also has a large primate collection including orangutans, gibbons, chimpanzees, mandrill, lemurs, capuchin monkeys, titi monkeys and Saimiri.  The park's bird collection includes cranes, ibises, flamingoes, swans, storks, parrots, macaws, vultures, falcons, eagles and penguins.  Other animals include pygmy hippopotamus, crocodiles, caiman, raccoons, red panda and meerkats.

Gallery

Notes

External links

 All Information, gallery and reviews
 Review and Photos from the park

Tourist attractions in Tenerife
Parks in Tenerife
Companies of the Canary Islands
Aspro Parks attractions